In taxonomy, Methanolacinia is a genus of the Methanomicrobiaceae. The cells are bar-shaped and irregular 0.6 μm in diameter and 1.5–2.5 μm in length.  They do not form endospores.  Most are non-motile, but some have a single flagellum.  They are strictly anaerobic. They produce methane through the reduction of carbon dioxide with hydrogen and cannot use formate, acetate or methyl compounds as substrates.

See also
 List of Archaea genera

References

Further reading

Scientific journals

Scientific books

Scientific databases

External links

Methanolacinia at BacDive -  the Bacterial Diversity Metadatabase

Archaea genera
Euryarchaeota